Year 183 (CLXXXIII) was a common year starting on Tuesday (link will display the full calendar) of the Julian calendar. At the time, it was known as the Year of the Consulship of Aurelius and Victorinus (or, less frequently, year 936 Ab urbe condita). The denomination 183 for this year has been used since the early medieval period, when the Anno Domini calendar era became the prevalent method in Europe for naming years.

Events 
 By place 
 Roman Empire 
 An assassination attempt on Emperor Commodus by members of the Senate fails.

Births 
 January 26 – Lady Zhen, wife of the Cao Wei state Emperor Cao Pi (d. 221)
 Hu Zong, Chinese general, official and poet of the Eastern Wu state (d. 242)
 Liu Zan (Zhengming), Chinese general of the Eastern Wu state (d. 255)
 Lu Xun, Chinese general and politician of the Eastern Wu state (d. 245)

Deaths

References